Asclepius (Asklēpiós) is a hero and god of medicine in ancient Greek religion and mythology. He is the son of Apollo and Coronis, or Arsinoe, or of Apollo alone. Asclepius represents the healing aspect of the medical arts; his daughters, the "Asclepiades", are: Hygieia ("Health, Healthiness"), Iaso (from ἴασις "healing, recovering, recuperation", the goddess of recuperation from illness), Aceso (from ἄκεσις "healing", the goddess of the healing process), Aegle (the goddess of good health) and Panacea (the goddess of universal remedy). He has several sons as well. He was associated with the Roman/Etruscan god Vediovis and the Egyptian Imhotep. He shared with Apollo the epithet Paean ("the Healer"). The rod of Asclepius, a snake-entwined staff, (similar to the caduceus) remains a symbol of medicine today. Those physicians and attendants who served this god were known as the Therapeutae of Asclepius.

Etymology 
The etymology of the name is unknown. In his revised version of Frisk's Griechisches etymologisches Wörterbuch (Greek Etymological Dictionary), R.S.P. Beekes gives this summary of the different attempts:

"H. Grégoire (with R. Goossens and M. Mathieu) in Asklépios, Apollon Smintheus et Rudra 1949 (Mém. Acad. Roy. de Belgique. Cl. d. lettres. 2. sér. 45), explains the name as "the mole-hero", connecting  'mole' and refers to the resemblance of the Tholos in Epidauros and the building of a mole. (Thus Puhvel, Comp. Mythol. 1987, 135.) But the variants of Asklepios and those of the word for "mole" do not agree.

Szemerényi's etymology (JHS 94, 1974, 155) from Hitt. assula(a)- "well-being" and piya- "give" cannot be correct, as it does not explain the velar."

Beekes suggested a Pre-Greek proto-form *Atyklap-.

His name may mean "to cut open" from a story about his birth.

Mythology

Birth 
Asclepius was the son of Apollo and, according to the earliest accounts, a mortal woman named Coronis. When she displayed infidelity by sleeping with a mortal named Ischys, Apollo realised this with his prophetic powers and killed Ischys. Coronis was killed by Artemis for being unfaithful to Apollo and was laid out on a funeral pyre to be consumed, but Apollo rescued the child by cutting him from Coronis' womb.

According to Delphian tradition, Asclepius was born in the temple of Apollo, with Lachesis acting as a midwife and Apollo relieving the pains of Coronis. Apollo named the child after Coronis' nickname, Aegle.

Phoenician tradition maintains that Asclepius was born of Apollo without any woman involved.

According to the Roman version, Apollo, having learned about Coronis' betrayal with the mortal Ischys through his raven Lycius, killed her with his arrows. Before breathing her last, she revealed to Apollo that she was pregnant with his child. He repented his actions and unsuccessfully tried to save her. At last, he removed their son safely from her belly before she was consumed by the fire.

In yet another version, Coronis who was already pregnant with Apollo's child, had to accompany her father to Peloponnesos. She had kept her pregnancy hidden from her father. In Epidaurus, she bore a son and exposed him on a mountain called Tittheion (from τίτθη "wet nurse", τιτθεύω "to suckle, breastfeed"). The child was given milk by one of the goats that pastured about the mountain, and was guarded by the watch-dog of the herd. Aresthanas, the owner of goats and the guard dogs found the child. As he came near, he saw lightning that flashed from the child, and thinking of it to be a sign of divine, he left the child alone. Asclepius was later taken by Apollo.

Education and adventures 

Apollo named the rescued baby "Asclepius" and reared him for a while and taught him many things about medicine. However, like his half-brother, Aristaeus, Asclepius had his formal education under the centaur Chiron who instructed him in the art of medicine.

It is said that in return for some kindness rendered by Asclepius, a snake licked Asclepius's ears clean and taught him secret knowledge (to the Greeks snakes were sacred beings of wisdom, healing, and resurrection). Asclepius bore a rod wreathed with a snake, which became associated with healing. Another version states that when Asclepius (or in another myth Polyidus) was commanded to restore the life of Glaucus, he was confined in a secret prison. While pondering on what he should do, a snake crept near his staff. Lost in his thoughts, Asclepius unknowingly killed it by hitting it again and again with his staff. Later, another snake came there with an herb in its mouth, and placed it on the head of dead snake, which soon came back to life. Seeing this, Asclepius used the same herb, which brought Glaucus back. A species of non-venomous pan-Mediterranean serpent, the Aesculapian snake (Zamenis longissimus) is named for the god.

He was originally called Hepius but received his popular name of Asclepius after he cured Ascles, ruler of Epidaurus who suffered an incurable ailment in his eyes. Asclepius became so proficient as a healer that he surpassed both Chiron and his father, Apollo. Asclepius was therefore able to evade death and to bring others back to life from the brink of death and beyond. This caused an excessive abundance of human beings, and Zeus resorted to killing him to maintain balance in the numbers of the human population.

At some point, Asclepius was among those who took part in the Calydonian Boar hunt.

Marriage and family
Asclepius was married to Epione, with whom he had five daughters: Hygieia, Panacea, Aceso, Iaso, and Aegle, and three sons: Machaon, Podaleirios and Telesphoros. He also sired a son, Aratus, with Aristodama.

Death and resurrection as a god 
Asclepius once started bringing back to life the dead people like Tyndareus, Capaneus, Glaucus, Hymenaeus, Lycurgus and others. Others say he brought Hippolytus back from the dead on Artemis' request, and accepted gold for it. It is the only mention of Asclepius resurrecting the dead. In all other accounts he is said to use his skills simply as a physician.

However, Hades accused Asclepius for stealing his subjects and complained to his brother Zeus about it. According to others, Zeus was afraid that Asclepius would teach the art of resurrection to other humans as well. So he killed Asclepius with his thunderbolt. This angered Apollo who in turn killed the Cyclopes who made the thunderbolts for Zeus. For this act, Zeus banished Apollo from Olympus and commanded him to serve Admetus, King of Thessaly, for a year. After Asclepius's death, Zeus placed his body among the stars as the constellation Ophiuchus ("the Serpent Holder").

Later, however, upon Apollo's request, Zeus resurrected Asclepius as a god and gave him a place on Olympus.

Sacred places and practices 

The most ancient and the most prominent asclepeion (or healing temple) according to the geographer of the 1st century BC, Strabo, was situated in Trikala. The 1st century AD Pool of Bethesda, described in the Gospel of John, chapter 5, was found by archaeologists in 1964 to be part of an asclepeion. One of the most famous temples of Asclepius was at Epidaurus in north-eastern Peloponnese, dated to the fourth century BC. Another famous asclepeion was built approximately a century later on the island of Kos, where Hippocrates, the legendary "father of medicine", may have begun his career. Other asclepieia were situated in Gortys (in Arcadia), and Pergamum in Asia.

From the fifth century BC onwards, the cult of Asclepius grew very popular and pilgrims flocked to his healing temples (Asclepieia) to be cured of their ills. Ritual purification would be followed by offerings or sacrifices to the god (according to means), and the supplicant would then spend the night in the holiest part of the sanctuary– the abaton (or adyton). Any dreams or visions would be reported to a priest who would prescribe the appropriate therapy by a process of interpretation. Some healing temples also used sacred dogs to lick the wounds of sick petitioners. In honor of Asclepius, a particular type of non-venomous snake was often used in healing rituals, and these snakes— the Aesculapian Snakes— slithered around freely on the floor in dormitories where the sick and injured slept. These snakes were introduced at the founding of each new temple of Asclepius throughout the classical world.

The original Hippocratic Oath began with the invocation "I swear by Apollo the Physician and by Asclepius and by Hygieia and Panacea and by all the gods ...".

Epidauria (τὰ Ἐπιδαύρια) was a festival at Athens in honour of Asclepius.

Some later religious movements claimed links to Asclepius. In the 2nd century AD the controversial miracle-worker Alexander claimed that his god Glycon, a snake with a "head of linen" was an incarnation of Asclepius. The Greek language rhetorician and satirist Lucian produced the work Alexander the False Prophet to denounce the swindler for future generations. He described Alexander as having a character "made up of lying, trickery, perjury, and malice; [it was] facile, audacious, venturesome, diligent in the execution of its schemes, plausible, convincing, masking as good, and wearing an appearance absolutely opposite to its purpose." In Rome, the College of Aesculapius and Hygia was an association (collegium) that served as a burial society and dining club that also participated in the Imperial cult.

The botanical genus Asclepias (commonly known as milkweed) is named after him and includes the medicinal plant A. tuberosa or "Pleurisy root".

Asclepius was depicted on the reverse of the Greek 10,000 drachmas banknote of 1995–2001.

At the city of Miletus, archaeologists discovered a cave under the city's theatre which was associated with Asclepius cult.

See also
Rod of Asclepius
Darrhon
1027 Aesculapia

Notes

References

Primary sources 

 Apollodorus, The Library with an English Translation by Sir James George Frazer, F.B.A., F.R.S. in 2 Volumes, Cambridge, MA, Harvard University Press; London, William Heinemann Ltd. 1921. ISBN 0-674-99135-4. Online version at the Perseus Digital Library. Greek text available from the same website.
 Apollonius Rhodius, Argonautica translated by Robert Cooper Seaton (1853-1915), R. C. Loeb Classical Library Volume 001. London, William Heinemann Ltd, 1912. Online version at the Topos Text Project.
 Apollonius Rhodius, Argonautica. George W. Mooney. London. Longmans, Green. 1912. Greek text available at the Perseus Digital Library.
 Diodorus Siculus, The Library of History translated by Charles Henry Oldfather. Twelve volumes. Loeb Classical Library. Cambridge, Massachusetts: Harvard University Press; London: William Heinemann, Ltd. 1989. Vol. 3. Books 4.59–8. Online version at Bill Thayer's Web Site
 Diodorus Siculus, Bibliotheca Historica. Vol 1-2. Immanel Bekker. Ludwig Dindorf. Friedrich Vogel. in aedibus B. G. Teubneri. Leipzig. 1888-1890. Greek text available at the Perseus Digital Library.
 Gaius Julius Hyginus, Astronomica from The Myths of Hyginus translated and edited by Mary Grant. University of Kansas Publications in Humanistic Studies. Online version at the Topos Text Project.
 Homer, The Iliad with an English Translation by A.T. Murray, Ph.D. in two volumes. Cambridge, MA., Harvard University Press; London, William Heinemann, Ltd. 1924. . Online version at the Perseus Digital Library.
 Homer, Homeri Opera in five volumes. Oxford, Oxford University Press. 1920. . Greek text available at the Perseus Digital Library
 The Homeric Hymns and Homerica with an English Translation by Hugh G. Evelyn-White. Homeric Hymns. Cambridge, MA.,Harvard University Press; London, William Heinemann Ltd. 1914. Online version at the Perseus Digital Library. Greek text available from the same website.
 Lycophron, The Alexandra translated by Alexander William Mair. Loeb Classical Library Volume 129. London: William Heinemann, 1921. Online version at the Topos Text Project.
 Lycophron, Alexandra translated by A.W. Mair. London: William Heinemann; New York: G.P. Putnam's Sons. 1921. Greek text available at the Perseus Digital Library.
 Marcus Tullius Cicero, Nature of the Gods from the Treatises of M.T. Cicero translated by Charles Duke Yonge (1812-1891), Bohn edition of 1878. Online version at the Topos Text Project.
 Marcus Tullius Cicero, De Natura Deorum. O. Plasberg. Leipzig. Teubner. 1917. Latin text available at the Perseus Digital Library.
 Pausanias, Description of Greece with an English Translation by W.H.S. Jones, Litt.D., and H.A. Ormerod, M.A., in 4 Volumes. Cambridge, MA, Harvard University Press; London, William Heinemann Ltd. 1918. . Online version at the Perseus Digital Library
 Pausanias, Graeciae Descriptio. 3 vols. Leipzig, Teubner. 1903. Greek text available at the Perseus Digital Library.
 Pindar, Odes translated by Diane Arnson Svarlien. 1990. Online version at the Perseus Digital Library.
 Pindar, The Odes of Pindar including the Principal Fragments with an Introduction and an English Translation by Sir John Sandys, Litt.D., FBA. Cambridge, MA., Harvard University Press; London, William Heinemann Ltd. 1937. Greek text available at the Perseus Digital Library.
 Publius Ovidius Naso, Fasti translated by James G. Frazer. Online version at the Topos Text Project.
 Publius Ovidius Naso, Fasti. Sir James George Frazer. London; Cambridge, MA. William Heinemann Ltd.; Harvard University Press. 1933. Latin text available at the Perseus Digital Library.
 Tzetzes, John, Book of Histories, Book IX-X translated by Jonathan Alexander from the original Greek of T. Kiessling's edition of 1826. Online version at theoi.com

Secondary sources 
 Edelstein, Ludwig and Emma Edelstein. Asclepius: Collection and Interpretation of the Testimonies, Baltimore, The Johns Hopkins Press, 1945.
 von Ehrenheim, Hedvig. Greek Incubation Rituals in Classical and Hellenistic Times. Kernos. Supplément, 29. Liège:  Presses Universitaires de Liège, 2015.
 Farnell, Lewis Richard. Greek Hero Cults and Ideas of Immortality, (Oxford Clarendon Press,1921).
 Grimal, Pierre, The Dictionary of Classical Mythology, Wiley-Blackwell, 1996, . "Asclepius" pp. 62–63
 Hart, Gerald D. MD. Asclepius: The God of Medicine (Royal Society of Medicine Press, 2000)
 Kool, S. "The Soother of Evil Pains: Asclepius and Freud." Akroterion 60, 2015, pp. 13–32.
 LiDonnici, Lynn R. The Epidaurian Miracle Inscriptions: Text, Translation, and Commentary. Atlanta: Scholars, 1995.
 Mitchell-Boyask, Robin, Plague and the Athenian Imagination: Drama, History and the Cult of Asclepius, Cambridge University Press, 2008, .
 Oberhelman, Steven M. (ed.), Dreams, Healing, and Medicine in Greece: From Antiquity to the Present. Farnham; Burlington, VT:  Ashgate, 2013.
 Renberg, Gil H. "Public and Private Places of Worship in the Cult of Asclepius at Rome". Memoirs of the American Academy in Rome, 51/52, 2006, pp. 87–172.
 Riethmüller, Jürgen W. Asklepios : Heiligtümer und Kulte, Heidelberg, Verlag Archäologie und Geschichte, 2005, 
 
 Wickkiser, Bronwen. Asklepios, Medicine, and the Politics of Healing in Fifth-century Greece: Between Craft and Cult. JHU Press, 2008.

External links 
 Warburg Institute Iconographic Database (c. 100 images of Aesculapius)

Medicine gods
Health gods
Greek gods
Greek mythological heroes
Mythological Greek physicians
Argonauts
Children of Apollo
Demigods in classical mythology
Deeds of Zeus
Metamorphoses characters
 
Ancient Greek medicine
Snakes in religion
Kourotrophoi
Olympian deities